"I Needed to Fall" is a song written by Kevin Cronin and performed by REO Speedwagon for their 2007 album, Find Your Own Way Home. The song was released as the first single from the album, and charted on the Adult Contemporary chart at #25.

References

External links
I Needed to Fall lyrics

2007 singles
REO Speedwagon songs
Rock ballads
Songs written by Kevin Cronin
2006 songs
Song recordings produced by Kevin Cronin